Bouwlustlaan is a RandstadRail station in The Hague, Netherlands. It is a stop for line 4 and is located on the Meppelweg.

RandstadRail services
The following services currently call at Bouwlustlaan:

Gallery

RandstadRail stations in The Hague